Behnam Mahmoudi (born April 25, 1980, in Meyaneh) is an Iranian former volleyball player, who capped for more than 8 years in the Iran National Volleyball Team of the year 1998–2006. His brother Shahram Mahmoudi is also a successful international player.

Mahmoudi was famous for being the first Iranian volleyball player to ever play professionally outside of his country in a world top league when he signed for Perugia Volley in the first division of Italian Volleyball League, Serie A1.
He is currently vice-chairman of the City Council Civil Karaj.

Honours

National team
Asian Championship
Bronze medal (1): 2003
Asian Games
Silver medal (1): 2002

Club
AVC Club Championships
Gold medal (1): 2002, Paykan
Silver medal (2): 2000, 2004, Paykan
Bronze medal (1): 1999, Paykan
Iranian Volleyball Super League
Champions (4): 1997, 1998, 1999, 2000, Paykan

Individual
MVP: 1999 Asian Championship
Best Server: 2004 Olympic Qualification Tournament
Best Scorer: 2000 Asian Club Championship
Best Server: 2001 Asian Club Championship
MVP: 2002 Asian Club Championship

External links
FIVB Men's World Championship Japan 2006 Profile

1980 births
Living people
Iranian men's volleyball players
People from Mianeh
Asian Games silver medalists for Iran
Asian Games medalists in volleyball
Volleyball players at the 2002 Asian Games
Volleyball players at the 2006 Asian Games
Iranian sportsperson-politicians
Medalists at the 2002 Asian Games
Iranian expatriate sportspeople in Italy
Islamic Solidarity Games competitors for Iran